Georgia participated in the Junior Eurovision Song Contest 2011 which took place on 3 December 2011, in Yerevan, Armenia. Georgian Public Broadcaster (GPB) was responsible for organising their entry for the contest. Teen-pop group Candy was externally selected to represent Georgia with the song "Candy Music". Georgia won the contest with 108 points.

Background 

They have never missed an edition of the contest, and have won at the  contest.

Before Junior Eurovision

National final 
Georgia selected their Junior Eurovision entry for 2011 through a national selection consisting of 9 songs, hosted by Sophio Toroshelidze. The winner was girl-group Candy, with a song "Candy Music". Candy won the jury vote and came second in the televote, with first place from the televote going to 3T. The jury consisted of: Gia Janturia, Giorgi Gachechiladze, Mamuka Megrelishvili, Maya Baratashvili, Nika Tskhertsvadze and Irina Sanikidze. The final was originally scheduled to take place on 1 June, but after the deadline for song submission was changed to 9 June, the final was pushed back to 9 July. After the release of the competing entries, some were accused of plagiarism.

Artist and song information

Candy

The winning contestants, Candy, were an all-girl teen-pop group from Tbilisi, consisting of Irina Kovalenko, Ana Khanchalyan, Irina Khechanovi, Mariam Gvaladze and Gvantsa Saneblidze, and managed by Georgian composer Giga Kukhiadnidze and Bzikebi Studio.

Candy Music
"Candy Music" was a song recorded by Georgian teen girl group Candy, which won the Junior Eurovision Song Contest 2011 for Georgia, scoring 108 points.

At Junior Eurovision
During the running order draw which took place on 11 October 2011, Georgia was drawn to perform twelfth on 3 December 2011, following Sweden and preceding Belgium.

Final
During the final, Candy performed in a V formation with Irina Khechanovi at the front. They wore bright pink outfits, resembling candy. Candy won the Junior Eurovision Song Contest 2011, receiving 108 points for their song "Candy Music". This is the fewest points a winning song has ever received.

Voting

Notes

References 

	

Junior Eurovision Song Contest
Georgia (country)
2011